Teixeiro, or Teijeiro in Spanish, is a small community located in the province of A Coruña, in the Galician region of Spain.  It is part of the municipality of Curtis in the comarca of Betanzos of which it is capital.

The town hall of Curtis (Casa do Concello) is in Teixeiro as well as the Plaza de España ("Plaza of Spain").

External links

XuveCurtis.com - Website dedicated to the youth in the Curtis municipality. (Galician)
Casa Miraz - Website for the popular Casa Miraz restaurant. (Spanish)
Foro-Ciudad.com - Teixeiro Profile for Teixeiro in Foro-Ciudad.com. (Spanish)

Province of A Coruña
Populated places in Galicia (Spain)